Ethaliella pulchella is a species of sea snail, a marine gastropod mollusk in the family Trochidae, the top snails.

Description
The length of the shell varies between 4 mm and 10 mm. The umbilicate shell has a sublenticular shape and is obtusely angulated. It is smooth, shining, grayish-straw colored, above with little pale greenish-brown angular lines often confluent into wider streaks, below painted with white spots. The spire is a little prominent and contains five whorls. The whitish apex is a little acute. The base around the umbilicus is rather broadly, perspectively, radiately corrugated and angulate. The very oblique aperture has a subrhomboidal shape. Its throat is pearly. The outer lip has a small callus. The whitish peristome is straight and obtuse. The basal margin is arcuate. The columellar margin is expanded in a rosy, tongue-shaped callus, partly covering the umbilicus.

Distribution
This marine species occurs off the Philippines and in the Indo-West Pacific Region.

References

External links
 To Encyclopedia of Life
 To World Register of Marine Species
 

pulchella
Gastropods described in 1855